Anthony Frederick Augustus Burton (1785 – 5 September 1850) was an English cricketer who played for Kent in the 1820s. A wicket-keeper, he played twice in 1822 against Marylebone Cricket Club, totalling 42 runs with a highest score of 21 and capturing 5 victims with 3 catches and 2 stumpings.

Burton was born in 1785 and worked as a maltster at Westerham in Kent. He played village cricket for the Westerham side and is known to have played for a variety of other teams in West Kent, including Leigh. In 1826 and 1827 he played for the Players of Kent against the Gentlemen of Kent. He died at Wimbledon in 1850, leaving property to his wife Sarah.

References

Sources
 

1785 births
1850 deaths
English cricketers
English cricketers of 1787 to 1825
Kent cricketers